Claudine Michel is the editor of the Journal of Haitian Studies and a professor emerita of Black studies at the University of California, Santa Barbara. Michel is the Director of the UCSB Center for Black Studies Research. She is a Haitian native and practitioner of Haitian Vodou, and has done much in the field of Haitian studies.

Michel believes that aid after the 2010 Haiti earthquake is too top-to-bottom, resulting in Haiti "losing [its] soul".

Works 

 Etude Comparative des Théories du Dévelopement de l'Enfant (DeBoeck/Université, Bruxelles/Paris, 1994). Co-author.
 Aspects Moraux et Educatifs du Vodou Haitien (Le Natal, Port-au-Prince, Haiti, 1995)
 Haitian Vodou: Spirit, Myth, and Reality (Indiana University Press, 2006). Co-author.
 Vodou in Haitian Life and Culture: Invisible Powers" (2006). Written by Patrick Bellegarde-Smith, edited by Michel.
 Offerings: Continuity and Transformation in Haitian Vodou (Oxford Press)

Awards and honors 
The Claudine Michel Fund at UC Santa Barbara was created in her honor, and awards "diverse faculty, staff and/or students".

Michel received the Haitian Studies Association Service Award in 2008, particularly for her work as editor of the Journal of Haitian Studies.

References 

 "A Conversation with Claudine Michel". Center for Culture, Society, and Religion. Retrieved 2022-11-01.

External links 

 "Claudine Michel | Department of Black Studies - UC Santa Barbara". www.blackstudies.ucsb.edu. Retrieved 2022-10-30.
 "Poto Mitan: Dr. Claudine Michel, consultant for film and Chair of the Department of Black Studies and Director for the Center for Black Studies Research, UC Santa Barbara". potomitan.net. Retrieved 2022-10-30.

Living people
University of California, Santa Barbara faculty
Haitian women academics
Black studies scholars
Haitian Vodou practitioners
Year of birth missing (living people)